Martin Postle is a British art historian who is deputy director for collections and publications at the Paul Mellon Centre for Studies in British Art, London, and a leading expert on the art of Sir Joshua Reynolds. He is a former curator at the Tate Gallery.

Early life and education
Martin Postle received his BA in art history with history from the University of Nottingham. He received his MA from the Courtauld Institute of Art in 1981 and his PhD from Birkbeck College, University of London.

Career
From 1992 to 1998, Postle was associate professor of art history at the University of Delaware and director of the University of Delaware's London centre. In 1998 he joined the Tate Gallery where he was senior curator, British art 1500–1780, and subsequently head of British art to 1900.

Postle joined the Paul Mellon Centre for Studies in British Art in London in 2007 as assistant director for academic activities. He is currently deputy director for grants and publications there.

In 2008, Postle was elected a fellow of the Society of Antiquaries of London.

Exhibitions curated
The Artist's Model. Its role in British Art from Lely to Etty (Kenwood and Nottingham 1991, with Ilaria Bignamini)
Angels and Urchins. The Fancy Picture in 18th-Century British Art (Kenwood and Nottingham 1998)
The Artist's Model: From Etty to Spencer (Kenwood, Nottingham and York 1999, with William Vaughan)
Art of the Garden. The Garden in British Art, 1800 to the Present Day (Tate Britain, Belfast and Manchester 2004, with Nicholas Alfrey and Stephen Daniels)
Joshua Reynolds. The Creation of Celebrity (Tate Britain and Palazzo dei Diamanti, Ferrara 2005)
Stanley Spencer and the English Garden (Compton Verney 2011, with Steven Parissien)
Johan Zoffany, RA. Society Observed (Yale Center for British Art and the Royal Academy of Arts, London 2011-2012)
Richard Wilson and the Transformation of European Landscape Painting (Yale Center for British Art and the National Museum Wales, Cardiff, 2014).

Selected publications
Sir Joshua Reynolds: The subject pictures. Cambridge University Press, Cambridge, 1995. 
The artist's model: From Etty to Spencer. Merrell, 1999. (With William Vaughan) 
Sir Joshua Reynolds: A complete catalogue of his paintings. Yale University Press, 2000. (The Paul Mellon Centre for Studies in British Art) 
Thomas Gainsborough. Tate Publishing, London, 2002. (British Artists Series) 
Joshua Reynolds: The creation of celebrity. Tate Publishing, London, 2005. 
Pictures of innocence: Portraits of children from Hogarth to Lawrence. Holburne Museum of Art, Bath, 2005. 
Model and supermodel: The artist's model in British art and culture. Manchester University Press, Manchester, 2007.

References

Year of birth missing (living people)
Living people
British art historians
British art curators
British non-fiction writers
Alumni of the University of Nottingham
University of Delaware faculty
British male writers
Alumni of the Courtauld Institute of Art
Alumni of Birkbeck, University of London
Fellows of the Society of Antiquaries of London
Male non-fiction writers